The Tank 300 is a mid-size SUV produced by Great Wall Motors since 2020. It was originally sold under the Wey premium brand as the Wey Tank 300. Since April 2021, the vehicle was renamed as the Tank 300.

Overview

The Tank 300 was originally presented in July 2020 at the Chengdu Auto Show as the Wey Tank 300. It went on sale on the Chinese market on 17 December 2020. It is the first vehicle to be built on the platform called "Tank" by Great Wall. The Tank 300 comes in 4 versions: city, off-road, Yunliang and cyberpunk.

According to the Trademark Office of the China National Intellectual Property Administration (CNIPA), Great Wall Motors applied for trademark registration for the Tank  marque in December 2020. Great Wall Motors is aiming to develop Tank as a standalone off-road vehicle marque according to Wei Jianjun, chairman of GWM during the China Automotive Innovation Conference (AII) on 21 March 2021.

Great Wall announced the decision to turn Tank into a standalone brand during the 2021 Shanghai Auto Show in April 2021, with its name written in caps. The first car to be launched under the Tank brand will be the Tank 300, a renamed Wey Tank 300.

Powertrain
The Tank 300 is powered by a 2.0-litre turbo-charged petrol engine known from the other WEY models.

The vehicle has three Eaton differential lockers and low range gearbox.

Tank 300 HEV concept
The Tank 300 HEV concept car debuted in Thailand. It is equipped with a 2.0T+9HAT powertrain and features transparent chassis technology.

Exports 
On July 6, 2022, the Tank 300 was launched in Saudi Arabia.

References

External links
 Official Website 
 Official Website 

Tank 300
Cars introduced in 2020
Mid-size sport utility vehicles
All-wheel-drive vehicles
Hybrid electric cars